The Special Escort Group (SEG) is a department within the Royalty and Specialist Protection (RaSP) of the Metropolitan Police Service. Formed in 1952, the SEG provides mobile armed protection to members of the Royal family and Government ministers. In addition they carry out armed vehicle escorts of high risk (category A) prisoners and high value loads.

Role
The department supports the wider protection command of RaSP, typically operating within the London area. They provide armed motorcycle escorts for members of the royal family, protected members of the Government, visiting royals, heads of state and other visiting dignitaries. It also provides armed vehicle escorts for valuable, hazardous and protected loads and high risk prisoners.

This specialist unit of the Metropolitan Police consists of officers with a range of skills and operational experience from various policing backgrounds. One motorcyclist (lead bike) positions themselves directly in front of the escort, controlling the precise pace, position, speed and timing of the escort, whilst the others forge ahead, dealing with traffic situations and advising the lead bike of the safest path through the traffic they are controlling. SEG officers use low-volume, high-pitched whistles in clear deference to sirens (which are not fitted). This reduces the level of noise that precedes an escort and softens the environmental impact on the escorted person and general public.

Equipment 
Officers from the SEG are among the few police motorcyclists in the UK that carry firearms openly whilst riding. All SEG officers are trained in vehicle and firearms tactics. These include advanced car driving, advanced motorcycle riding, anti-hijack driving, armoured car driving, and firearms tactics.

The SEG use a wide range of marked and unmarked vehicles, and all officers are authorised firearms officers who always carry firearms.

References

External links
 Inconspicuous Ingenuity 2014 - Escorted by the Met Police Special Escort Group

Metropolitan Police units